Barbara Urquiza (born 24 January 2003)  is a Brazilian rhythmic gymnastics, member of the national group.

Personal life 
Urquiza took up the sport at age 12, he first tried artistic gymnastics before being convinced to try rhythmic gymnastics. She now trains at the National Rhythmic Gymnastics Training Centre in Aracaju.

Career 
In 2022 she entered the senior national group rooster getting to compete at the World Championships in Kitakyushu along Maria Arakaki, Vitoria Guerra, Deborah Medrado, Nicole Pircio and Beatriz Silva, the group was 9th in the All-Around, 7th with 5 balls and 11th with 3 hoops and 4 clubs. In 2022 she competed at two World Cups, Portimão where the group was 5th in the All-Around and with 5 hoops and 4th with 3 ribbons and 2 balls, and Pesaro where they finished 4th in the All-Around, 8th with 5 hoops and won bronze with 3 ribbons and 2 balls, the first World Cup medal since 2013 and only the second ever for Brazil. In July she won gold in the All-Around and 5 hoops as well as silver with 3 ribbons and 2 balls at the 2022 Pan American Gymnastics Championships in Rio de Janeiro along Maria Eduarda Arakaki, Déborah Medrado, Nicole Pircio, Gabrielle da Silva and Giovanna Oliveira. 

In September 2022 she was selected for the World Championships in Sofia along Maria Arakaki, Deborah Medrado, Gabrielle Moraes, Nicole Pircio, Giovanna Oliveira and the two individuals Geovanna Santos and Barbara Domingos, finishing 10th in teams, 5th in the All-Around, 4th with 5 hoops and 10th with 3 ribbons and 2 balls.

References 

2003 births
Brazilian rhythmic gymnasts
Living people
21st-century Brazilian women